The 1997 Commonwealth of Independent States Cup was the fifth edition of the competition between the champions of former republics of Soviet Union. It was won by Dynamo Kyiv second time in a row.

Participants

 1 Köpetdag Aşgabat invited as a Turkemenistan League title holders and 1996–97 season 2nd team as of the winter break. The spring part of the season was eventually cancelled and Köpetdag became a runners-up of an unfinished championship.
 2 Russia XI was a non age-restricted representation of Russian Top League, bringing together candidates for the senior national team.

Group stage

Group A

Results

Group B

Results

Group C

Results

Group D
Unofficial table

Official table

Results

Final rounds

Quarterfinals

Semifinals

Final

Top scorers

External links
 1997 Commonwealth of Independent States Cup at RSSSF

1997
1997 in Russian football
1996–97 in Ukrainian football
1996–97 in European football
January 1997 sports events in Russia
February 1997 sports events in Russia
1997 in Moscow